Morné Karg (born 12 July 1977 in Windhoek) is a Namibian cricketer. He is a right-handed batsman and wicketkeeper.

He has appeared in the ICC Trophy since 1994 and in List A cricket between 2001 and 2003. He also played three One Day Internationals in the World Cup in 2003.

Karg's usual position in the batting line-up is as opener along with team-mate Jan-Berrie Burger.

References

External links

1977 births
Living people
Cricketers from Windhoek
Namibian cricketers
Namibia One Day International cricketers
Wicket-keepers